Larv is a village situated in Vara Municipality, Västra Götaland County, Sweden with 216 inhabitants in 2005. It was the birthplace of the botanist Adam Afzelius.

References 

Populated places in Västra Götaland County